An inverted nipple (occasionally invaginated nipple) is a condition where the nipple, instead of pointing outward, is retracted into the breast. In some cases, the nipple will be temporarily protruded if stimulated. Both women and men can have inverted nipples.

Causes
The most common causes of nipple inversion include:
 Born with condition
 Trauma which can be caused by conditions such as fat necrosis, scars, or a result of surgery
 Breast sagging, drooping or ptosis
 Breast cancer 
Breast carcinoma
Paget's disease
Inflammatory breast cancer 
 Breast infections or inflammations
Mammary duct ectasia
Breast abscess
Mastitis
 Genetic variant of nipple shape, such as: 
Weaver syndrome
Congenital disorder of glycosylation type 1A and 1 L 
Kennerknecht-Sorgo-Oberhoffer syndrome
 Gynecomastia
 Recurrent infections
 Tuberculosis
Most common nipple variations that women are born with are caused by short ducts or a wide areola muscle sphincter.

Inverted nipples can also occur after sudden and major weight loss.

Grading system
The three grades of inverted nipples are defined on how easily the nipple may be protracted and the degree of fibrosis existent in the breast, as well as the damage it has caused on the milk ducts.

Inverted nipple grade 1 refers to nipples that can easily be pulled out, by using finger pressure around the areola. The grade-1 inverted nipple maintains its projections and rarely retracts. Also, grade-1 inverted nipples may occasionally pop up without manipulation or pressure. Milk ducts are usually not compromised and breast feeding is possible. These are "shy nipples". It is believed to have minimal or no fibrosis. There is no soft-tissue deficiency of the nipple. The lactiferous duct should be normal without any retraction.

Inverted nipple grade 2 is the nipple which can be pulled out, though not as easily as the grade 1, but which retracts after pressure is released. Breast feeding is usually possible, though it is more likely to be hard to get the baby to latch comfortably in the first weeks after birth; extra help may be needed. Grade 2 nipples have a moderate degree of fibrosis. The lactiferous ducts are mildly retracted, but do not need to be cut for the release of fibrosis. On histological examination, these nipples have rich collagenous stromata with numerous bundles of smooth muscle. 

Inverted nipple grade 3 describes a severely inverted and retracted nipple which can rarely be pulled out physically and which requires surgery to be protracted. Milk ducts are often constricted, and breast feeding is difficult, but not necessarily impossible. With good preparation and help, babies often can drink at the breast, and milk production is not affected; after breastfeeding, nipples often are less or no longer inverted. Women with grade-3 inverted nipples may also struggle with infections, rashes, or problems with nipple hygiene. The fibrosis is remarkable and lactiferous ducts are short and severely retracted. The bulk of soft tissue is markedly insufficient in the nipple. Histologically, atrophic terminal duct lobular units and severe fibrosis are seen.

Pregnancy and breastfeeding 
Women with inverted nipples may find that their nipples protract (come out) temporarily or permanently during pregnancy, or as a result of breastfeeding. Most women with inverted nipples who give birth are able to breastfeed without complication, but inexperienced mothers may experience higher than average pain and soreness when initially attempting to breastfeed. When a mother uses proper breastfeeding technique, the infant latches onto the areola, not the nipple, so women with inverted nipples are actually able to breastfeed without any problem. An infant that latches on well may be able to slush out an inverted nipple. The use of a breast pump or other suction device immediately before a feeding may help to draw out inverted nipples. A hospital grade electric pump may be used for this purpose. Some women also find that using a nipple shield can help facilitate breastfeeding. Frequent stimulation such as sexual intercourse and foreplay (such as nipple sucking) also helps the nipple protract.

Piercing
Another method of protracting inverted nipples is to have the nipple pierced. This method will only be effective if the nipple can be temporarily protracted. If pierced when protracted, the jewellery may prevent the nipple from returning to its inverted state. The success of both of these methods, from a cosmetic standpoint, is mixed. The piercing may actually correct the overly taut connective tissue to allow the nipple to become detached from underlying connective tissue and resume a more typical appearance.

Other corrective strategies
Other strategies for protracting inverted nipples include regularly stimulating the nipples to a protruding state, in an attempt to gradually loosen the nipple tissue. Some sex toys designed for nipple stimulation, such as suction cups or clamps, may also cause inverted nipples to protract or stay protracted longer. Some special devices are specifically designed to draw out inverted nipples, or a home-made nipple protractor can be constructed out of a 10-ml disposable syringe. These methods are often used in preparation for breastfeeding, which can sometimes cause inverted nipples to become protracted permanently.

Two methods which are now discouraged are breast shells and the Hoffman technique. Breast shells may be used to apply gentle constant pressure to the areola to try to break any adhesions under the skin that are preventing the nipple from being drawn out. The shells are worn inside the bra. The Hoffman technique is a nipple-stretching exercise that may help loosen the adhesions at the base of the nipple when performed several times a day. Although both techniques are heavily promoted, a 1992 study found that not only do shells and the Hoffman technique not promote more successful breastfeeding, but they may also actually disrupt it.

References

External links 

 Inflammatory Breast Cancer
 Inversion of Nipple

Breast diseases
Nipple